The Ameritech Cup (known also as the Virginia Slims of Chicago and the Avon Championships of Chicago) is a defunct WTA Tour affiliated tennis tournament held every year from 1971 until 1997 in Chicago, Illinois in the United States. Its sponsors were Virginia Slims from 1971 to 1978 and again from 1983 to 1994, Avon from 1979 to 1982 and Ameritech from 1995 to 1997. The tournament was classified as Tier III in 1988-1989, Tier I in 1990 and Tier II until 1997, and was played on indoor carpet courts.

Martina Navratilova was the most successful player at the tournament, winning the singles competition 12 times and the doubles competition 7 times. Past champions also include former No. 1 players Chris Evert (1977), Monica Seles (1993) and Lindsay Davenport (1997).

Past finals

Singles

Doubles

References

External links 
 List of tournament champions (1973–1974)

 
Indoor tennis tournaments
Carpet court tennis tournaments
WTA Tour
Recurring sporting events established in 1971
Recurring sporting events disestablished in 1997
Defunct tennis tournaments in the United States
Virginia Slims tennis tournaments
1971 establishments in Illinois
1997 disestablishments in Illinois
History of women in Illinois